The Light flyweight (45–48 kg) competition at the 2014 AIBA Women's World Boxing Championships was held from 16–24 November 2014.

Medalists

Draw

Preliminaries

Top half

Bottom half

Final

References

Light flyweight